Homalium travancoricum is a species of plant in the family Salicaceae. It is native to Kerala and Tamil Nadu in India.

References

travancoricum
Flora of Kerala
Flora of Tamil Nadu
Vulnerable plants
Taxonomy articles created by Polbot